is a Japanese football player. He plays for YSCC Yokohama.

Career
Tomoyuki Katabira joined J3 League club YSCC Yokohama in 2016.

References

External links

1993 births
Living people
Kochi University alumni
Association football people from Hyōgo Prefecture
Japanese footballers
J3 League players
YSCC Yokohama players
Association football defenders